Yendang is a member of the Leko–Nimbari group of Savanna languages. It is spoken in northeastern Nigeria. Dialects are Kuseki, Yofo, Poli (Akule, Yakule).

ISO code
Yendang's ISO 639-3 code was changed from 'yen' to 'ynq' in March 2012 when Yotti was recognized as a distinct language; older references may still link to the older code.

External links 
 Paradisec has a collection of Roger Blench's that includes Yendang language materials

References

Mumuye–Yendang languages
Languages of Nigeria